Ocinara polia is a moth in the Bombycidae family. It was described by Tams in 1935. It is found on Sulawesi.

The wingspan is 23–38 mm. The ground colour is straw yellow with brown markings. The hindwings are lighter with a sepia hue.

References

Natural History Museum Lepidoptera generic names catalog

Bombycidae
Moths described in 1935